Hempholme is a hamlet in the East Riding of Yorkshire, England, in an area known as Holderness.

History
In 1823 Hempholme was in the civil parish of Leven, and the Wapentake and Liberty of Holderness. Population at the time was 93. Occupations at the time included six farmers, some of whom were yeomen, and a schoolmaster.

Governance
Hempholme forms part of the civil parish of Brandesburton.

The civil parish was in the Beverley and Holderness parliamentary constituency until the 2010 general election when it was transferred to the constituency of East Yorkshire.

References

Villages in the East Riding of Yorkshire
Holderness